Huang Yini (born 20 January 1993) is a Chinese footballer who plays as a midfielder for Chinese Women's Super League club Shanghai Shengli FC. She has been a member of the China women's national team.

International goals

References

1993 births
Living people
Chinese women's footballers
Women's association football midfielders
China women's international footballers
Asian Games silver medalists for China
Asian Games medalists in football
Medalists at the 2018 Asian Games
Footballers at the 2018 Asian Games